Moritz Sebastian Trompertz (born 21 September 1995) is a German field hockey player who plays as a midfielder for Rot-Weiss Köln.

He represented his country at the 2016 Summer Olympics, where he won the bronze medal.

References

External links
 
 
 
 
 

1995 births
Living people
German male field hockey players
Sportspeople from Cologne
Male field hockey midfielders
Field hockey players at the 2016 Summer Olympics
Olympic field hockey players of Germany
Olympic bronze medalists for Germany
Olympic medalists in field hockey
Medalists at the 2016 Summer Olympics
Rot-Weiss Köln players
HTC Uhlenhorst Mülheim players
2023 Men's FIH Hockey World Cup players